The Raspberries were an American pop rock band formed in 1970 from Cleveland, Ohio. They had a run of success in the early 1970s music scene with their pop rock sound, which AllMusic later described as featuring "exquisitely crafted melodies and achingly gorgeous harmonies." The members were known for their clean-cut public image, with short-hair and matching suits, which brought them teenybopper attention as well as scorn from some mainstream media outlets as "uncool". The group drew influence from the British Invasion era—especially The Beatles, The Who, The Hollies, and Small Faces—and its mod sensibility. In both the US and the UK, the Raspberries helped pioneer the power pop music style that took off after the group disbanded. They also have had a following among professional musicians such as Jack Bruce, Ringo Starr, and Courtney Love.

The group's "classic" lineup consisted of Eric Carmen (vocalist/guitarist/bassist/pianist), Wally Bryson (guitarist), Jim Bonfanti (drummer), and Dave Smalley (guitarist/bassist). Their best known songs include "Go All the Way", "Let's Pretend", "I Wanna Be with You", "Tonight", and "Overnight Sensation (Hit Record)".  Producer Jimmy Ienner was responsible for all four of the Raspberries' albums in the 1970s. The group disbanded in 1975 after a five-year run, and Eric Carmen proceeded to a successful career as a solo artist. Bryson and Smalley resurrected the group's name in 1999 for an album, which included singer/songwriter Scott McCarl as vocalist. In 2004, the original quartet reunited and undertook a well-received reunion tour in 2005.

History

Formation 
The group had its roots in two of Cleveland's most successful local bands in the late 1960s, The Choir and Cyrus Erie. The Choir, originally called The Mods and consisting of Dann Klawon, Wally Bryson, Dave Burke, Dave Smalley, and Jim Bonfanti, had a more extensive repertoire of original songs. Most notable was "It's Cold Outside" which parlayed its massive local success (#1 in Cleveland) into a nationally charting single (peaking at No. 68 for Roulette Records). The Choir then went through a series of lineup changes, with Smalley and Bonfanti remaining in the various versions, until 1968, when Dave Smalley was drafted and sent to Vietnam. As a result, The Choir disbanded, although it later reformed behind Bonfanti and ultimately survived until 1970.

Although The Choir had the hit and a string of singles, Cyrus Erie, founded by brothers Michael and Bob McBride, became the better-drawing local act shortly after Eric Carmen joined in 1967. Carmen persuaded Bryson, who had recently left The Choir, to join. In live shows, Cyrus Erie mainly covered other artists' songs. When the group signed to Epic Records they recorded two Carmen/Bryson originals ("Get the Message" b/w "Sparrow") as a single. Following this, Bryson quit to return to The Choir, which led to Cyrus Erie disbanding. Carmen and Dann Klawon then formed a new act called The Quick. The Quick  recorded a single of two Carmen/Klawon originals for Epic which did not find much success.

The group's style arose from a variety of rock and roll groups that the members loved, especially The Who. Carmen later said:

1970–1972 
After discussions between Carmen and Bonfanti about forming a new group, the first lineup for the Raspberries was Eric Carmen (rhythm guitar, vocals, piano), Jim Bonfanti (drums), Wally Bryson (lead guitar, vocals) and John Aleksic (bass). Aleksic left the group at the end of 1970. In 1971, Dave Smalley (rhythm guitar, vocals), just back from Vietnam, became the fourth member of the original recording lineup with Carmen moving to bass.  The Raspberries' demo tape went to the desk of producer Jimmy Ienner, for whom Carmen had previously done session work. After a major-label bidding war  the band signed to Capitol Records. This 1st album featured a strong scratch and sniff raspberry scented sticker on the front cover.

The Raspberries wore matching ensembles on stage. The group was criticized for making its stage entrance in tuxedos and large bouffant hairdos which, according to Carmen, "complemented the style of our music".

1972–1974 
"Go All the Way" peaked at #5 in the U.S. in October 1972, sold over one million copies, and was awarded a gold disc. Afterwards, Carmen and Smalley switched instruments, with Carmen moving to rhythm guitar so that he would be upfront on stage, while Smalley took over bass. After two albums, Raspberries and Fresh, both released in 1972, creative tension came to a head sparked largely by Carmen's creative dominance (and commercial success) over the contributions of Bryson and Smalley. Accordingly, Side 3 turned out to be a more raw, aggressive effort than its predecessors, typified by the opening track "Tonight". After its release, Smalley was ejected from the band, and Bonfanti departed soon afterwards. They subsequently formed their own band, Dynamite. They were replaced by bassist Scott McCarl and ex-Cyrus Erie drummer Michael McBride for what was to be the fourth and final Raspberries album, Starting Over.

Post-breakup 
The band broke up in April 1975, but their style continued to influence other musicians. Bruce Springsteen praised the Raspberries at several stops during his Summer 2005 tour. Springsteen's drummer Max Weinberg said that he based his drum style in that period off of Raspberries drummer Michael McBride (particularly on the Springsteen album Darkness on the Edge of Town). Paul Stanley of Kiss, Tom Petty, and Axl Rose of Guns N' Roses, have all also cited the Raspberries as an influence in their songwriting.

In 1978, Bryson joined another notable power pop band, Fotomaker, led by ex-Rascals Dino Danelli and Gene Cornish. He left shortly after the second of the band's three albums was released.

A biography of the Raspberries titled Overnight Sensation – The Story of the Raspberries by Ken Sharp was released in 1993. In 1996, a tribute album to Raspberries called Raspberries Preserved was released by Pravda Records, a Chicago-based indie record label. The album featured 21 cover versions by such acts as The Rubinoos, Bill Lloyd, Brad Jones, Tiny Lights, Rank Strangers, the Gladhands, and The Shambles.

Singer-guitarist and primary songwriter Eric Carmen went on to have a successful solo career as a singer and writer of romantic pop ballads. His first solo hit "All by Myself" (which rearranged a motif from the melody of "Let's Pretend") hit No. 2 nationally, and was successfully covered by Celine Dion in 1996. His second single "Never Gonna Fall in Love Again" was also a hit, as was a spiritual sequel to both, "She Did It," which revived the Raspberries' power pop sound. Carmen later had additional Top Ten singles success with "Hungry Eyes" (from Dirty Dancing, 1987) and "Make Me Lose Control".  He also wrote "Almost Paradise" (performed by Mike Reno and Ann Wilson for Footloose, 1984), as well as songs that were made major hits by Shaun Cassidy ("That's Rock & Roll" and "Hey Deanie").

In 1999, Bryson got the band back together without Carmen, but with Smalley and McCarl. The trio released a six-song EP entitled Raspberries Refreshed in 2000.  The album's tracks, written by the three remaining members, re-created the group's original sound.

In November 2004, the House of Blues nightclub chain opened its Cleveland branch with a Raspberries reunion concert featuring all four original members.  This led to a well-received 2005 mini-tour starting at the Chicago House of Blues, a VH1 Classic special, and a concert broadcast on XM Satellite Radio. A date from the 2005 tour in Los Angeles was recorded, and released in 2007 as Live on Sunset Strip. The double CD and one DVD contained a foreword from Bruce Springsteen, and a 1970s photo of John Lennon wearing a Raspberries' Starting Over sweatshirt.  Capitalizing on the release, Raspberries played further shows in New York, California, and their hometown of Cleveland.

The band's iconic rock tune "Go All the Way" attracted renewed attention in 2014 when it was notably included in the Marvel Cinematic Universe film Guardians of the Galaxy. The Albany Democrat-Herald ran a positive review of the film remarking that "while it's freaky to hear the Raspberries' ... in space, one recognizes the malleability of its majesty and craft and appreciate the range of vocalist Eric Carmen". The song was included on the film's Guardians of the Galaxy: Awesome Mix Vol. 1 soundtrack released on July 29, 2014.

In 2017, Omnivore Records released Pop Art Live, a recording of the band's first Cleveland reunion show on November 26, 2004. It was their first show together in nearly 30 years. Featuring twenty-eight songs, including material by major influences The Beatles and The Who, the album received positive reviews from publications such as Allmusic, Paste, and Stereophile. Critic Mark Deming of Allmusic remarked that "the Raspberries merge the superb craftsmanship of their classic recordings with the sweat and muscle of a crack band having a great time."

Band members
Eric Carmen – vocals, piano ; rhythm guitar ; bass 
Wally Bryson – lead guitar, vocals 
John Aleksic – bass 
Jim Bonfanti – drums 
Dave Smalley – rhythm guitar ; bass ; vocals 
Scott McCarl – bass, vocals 
Michael McBride – drums

Timeline

Discography

Studio albums

Select compilation albums

Live albums 
 Live on Sunset Strip (2007)
 Pop Art Live (2017)

Extended plays 

 Refreshed (2000)

Singles

Notes

References

Further reading
Wolff, Carlo (2006). Cleveland Rock and Roll Memories. Cleveland, OH: Gray & Company, Publishers.

External links
 

 
 "Live On Sunset Strip" review by Don Krider

American power pop groups
Musical groups from Cleveland
Musical groups from Ohio
Musical groups established in 1970
Musical groups disestablished in 1975
Musical groups reestablished in 2005
Musical groups disestablished in 2009
Rykodisc artists
Capitol Records artists
American pop rock music groups